Shikahogh State Reserve is Armenia’s second largest forest reserve, covering some  10,330 ha of land, and located in southern Armenia in the Syunik Province. Environmentalists have said it has been largely unaffected by Armenia’s massive post-Soviet deforestation due to its remote location and care shown by residents of nearby villages.

The Shikahogh State Reserve is home to about 1,100 species of plants, 70 of which have been registered in the Red Book of Armenia and 18 in the Red Book of the Soviet Union. The fauna of Shikahogh has not been fully explored, but studies have already revealed rare species of animals such as leopard, bezoar, bear, snowcock, viper, and hedgehog.

Highway controversy  
Shikahogh is the only place where the forest remains intact. It is home to unique species considered to be the wealth of not only Armenia but the whole world as well.

According to Social-Ecological Association Chairwoman Srbuhi Harutyunyan, trees in Mtnadzor were not logged only because they were beyond reach, but in this case the Mtnadzor forests are facing the threat of logging.

“Countries lacking in natural raw materials are eyeing our natural raw materials, and this is the only preserved unique forest, which is very dense and very useful and one can prepare various things from the raw material available here,” says Artemis Lepejyan, the Chairwoman of the Saint Sandukht Women’s Union. “The whole policy consists in the fact that they are ready to spend millions on this road, because they will make billions on it.”

See also 
Kapan
Geography of Armenia

References

External links 
Shikahogh State Preserve - Armeniapedia.org
'SOS! Shikahogh': the road to nowhere 
SOS Shikahogh, a 2007 documentary by the Armenia Tree Project

Tourist attractions in Syunik Province
Protected areas of Armenia
Forests of Armenia